The Council of Economic Advisers (CEA) is a United States agency within the Executive Office of the President established in 1946, which advises the President of the United States on economic policy. The CEA provides much of the empirical research for the White House and prepares the publicly-available annual Economic Report of the President.

Activities

Economic Report of the President 
The report is published by the CEA annually in February, no later than 10 days after the Budget of the US Government is submitted. The president typically writes a letter introducing the report, serving as an executive summary. The report proceeds with several hundred pages of qualitative and quantitative research reviewing the impact of economic activity in the previous year, outlining economic goals for the coming year (based on the President's economic agenda), and making numerical projections of economic performance and outcomes. Public criticism usually accompanies its release, sometimes attacking the importance placed or not placed on particular data or goals. The data referenced or used in the report are from the Bureau of Economic Analysis and U.S. Bureau of Labor Statistics.

History

Establishment 
The Truman administration established the Council of Economic Advisers via the Employment Act of 1946 to provide presidents with objective economic analysis and advice on the development and implementation of a wide range of domestic and international economic policy issues. It was a step from an "ad hoc style of economic policy-making to a more institutionalized and focused process". The act gave the council the following goals:

In 1949 Chairman Edwin Nourse and member Leon Keyserling argued about whether the advice should be private or public and about the role of government in economic stabilization. Nourse believed a choice had to be made between "guns or butter" but Keyserling argued for deficit spending, asserting that an expanding economy could afford large defense expenditures without sacrificing an increased standard of living. In 1949, Keyserling gained support from Truman advisors Dean Acheson and Clark Clifford. Nourse resigned as chairman, warning about the dangers of budget deficits and increased funding of "wasteful" defense costs. Keyserling succeeded to the chairmanship and influenced Truman's Fair Deal proposals and the economic sections of NSC 68 that, in April 1950, asserted that the larger armed forces America needed would not affect living standards or risk the "transformation of the free character of our economy".

1950s–80s 
During the 1953–54 recession, the CEA, headed by Arthur Burns, deployed non-traditional neo-Keynesian interventions, which provided results later called the "steady fifties" wherein many families stayed in the economic "middle class" with just one family wage-earner. The Eisenhower Administration supported an activist contracyclical approach that helped to establish Keynesianism as a possible bipartisan economic policy for the nation. Especially important in formulating the CEA response to the recession—accelerating public works programs, easing credit, and reducing taxes—were Arthur F. Burns and Neil H. Jacoby.

Until 1963, during its first seven years the CEA made five technical advances in policy making, including the replacement of a "cyclical model" of the economy by a "growth model", the setting of quantitative targets for the economy, use of the theories of fiscal drag and full-employment budget, recognition of the need for greater flexibility in taxation, and replacement of the notion of unemployment as a structural problem by a realization of a low aggregate demand.

The 1978 Humphrey–Hawkins Full Employment Act required each administration to move toward full employment and reasonable price stability within a specific time period. It has been criticized for making CEA's annual economic report highly political in nature, as well as highly unreliable and inaccurate over the standard two or five year projection periods.

1980–present

Since 1980, the CEA has focused on sources of economic growth, the supply side of the economy, and on international issues. In the wake of the Great Recession of 2008–09, the Council of Economic Advisers played a significant role in supporting the American Recovery and Reinvestment Act.

Organization
The council's chairman is nominated by the president and confirmed by the United States Senate. The members are appointed by the president. As of July 2017, the Council's 18 person staff consisted of a chief of staff (Director of Macroeconomic Forecasting), 15 economists (5 senior, 4 research, 4 staff economists, 2 economic statisticians) and 2 operations staff. Many of the staff economists are academics on leave or government economists on temporary assignment from other agencies.

Composition

Chairs

Members

 John D. Clark 1946–1953
 Roy Blough 1950–1952
 Leon Keyserling 1950–1953
 Robert C. Turner 1952–1953
 Karl A. Fox 1953–1955
 Neil H. Jacoby 1953–1955
 Asher Achinstein 1954–1956
 Walter W. Stewart 1953–1955
 Joseph S. Davis 1955–1958
 Paul W. McCracken 1956–1959
 Karl Brandt 1958–1961
 Henry C. Wallich 1959–1961
 James Tobin 1961–1962
 Kermit Gordon 1961–1962

 John P. Lewis 1963–1964
 Otto Eckstein 1964–1966
 James S. Duesenberry 1966–1968
 Merton J. Peck 1968–1969
 Warren L. Smith 1968–1969
 Hendrik S. Houthakker 1969–1971
 Herbert Stein 1969–1971
 Ezra Solomon 1971–1973
 Marina von Neumann Whitman 1972–1973
 Gary L. Seevers 1973–1975
 William J. Fellner 1973–1975
 Paul. W. MacAvoy 1975–1976
 Burton G. Malkiel 1975–1977
 William D. Nordhaus 1977–1979
 Lyle E. Gramley 1977–1980
 George C. Eads 1979–1981
 Stephen Goldfeld 1980–1981
 William A. Niskanen 1981–1985
 Jerry L. Jordan 1981–1982
 William Poole 1982–1985
 Thomas Gale Moore 1985–1989
 Michael L. Mussa 1986–1988
 John B. Taylor 1989–1991
 Richard L. Schmalensee 1989–1991
 David F. Bradford 1991–1993
 Paul Wonnacott 1991–1993
 Alan S. Blinder 1993–1994
 Carolyn Fischer 1994-1995
 Joseph Stiglitz 1993–1995
 Martin N. Baily 1995–1996
 Alicia H. Munnell 1996–1997
 Jeffrey A. Frankel 1997–1999
 Rebecca Blank 1998–1999
 Yu-Chin Chen 1999–2000
 Robert Z. Lawrence 1999–2001
 Kathryn L. Shaw 2000–2001
 Mark B. McClellan 2001–2002
 Randall S. Kroszner 2001–2003
 Kristin Forbes 2003–2005
 Harvey S. Rosen 2003–2005
 Katherine Baicker 2005–2007
 Matthew J. Slaughter 2005–2007
 Donald B. Marron Jr. 2008–2009
 Cecilia Rouse 2009–2011
 Carl Shapiro 2011–2012
 Katharine Abraham 2011–2013
 James H. Stock 2013–2014
 Betsey Stevenson 2013–2015
 Maurice Obstfeld 2014–2015
 Jay Shambaugh 2015–2017
 Sandra Black 2015–2017
 Richard Burkhauser 2017–2019
 Tomas J. Philipson 2017–2020
 Tyler Goodspeed 2019–2021
 Heather Boushey 2021–present
 Jared Bernstein 2021–present

References

Sources

External links
 
 List of recent reports by the Council of Economic Advisors
 Records of the Office of the Council of Economic Advisors, 1953–61, Dwight D. Eisenhower Presidential Library
 Papers of Arthur F. Burns, Dwight D. Eisenhower Presidential Library
 Papers of Raymond J. Saulnier, Dwight D. Eisenhower Presidential Library
Economic Report of the President:
Economic Report of the President White House 
Economic Reports 1947 to present on FRASER, St. Louis Federal Reserve
U.S. Bureau of Economic Analysis (BEA) US Gvt
U.S. Bureau of Labor Statistics
Economic Report of the President (1995–present) United States Government Publishing Office

Executive Office of the President of the United States

United States economic policy
United States national commissions
1946 establishments in the United States
Government agencies established in 1946